Maria "Marieke" van Drogenbroek (born 16 December 1964 in Utrecht) is a former international rower from the Netherlands, who won the bronze medal in the Women's Eights at the 1984 Summer Olympics in Los Angeles, California, alongside Lynda Cornet, Harriet van Ettekoven, Greet Hellemans, Nicolette Hellemans, Martha Laurijsen, Catharina Neelissen, Anne Quist, and Wiljon Vaandrager.

References
 Dutch Olympic Committee

1964 births
Living people
Dutch female rowers
Olympic rowers of the Netherlands
Rowers at the 1984 Summer Olympics
Olympic bronze medalists for the Netherlands
Sportspeople from Utrecht (city)
Olympic medalists in rowing
Medalists at the 1984 Summer Olympics
21st-century Dutch women
20th-century Dutch women